Greenan is a village in County Wicklow, Ireland.  Nearby are the towns of Rathdrum and Aughrim along with the glaciated valleys of Glendalough and Glenmalure. The name is spelled 'Greenane' on older signs in the village; the modern version drops the final 'e'. Greenan is also the name of a crossing in County Monaghan.

On the main road, there are a few houses and also a primary school named Greenans Cross National School.

See also
 List of towns and villages in Ireland

References

External links
 Greenan Farm Museums and Maze

Towns and villages in County Wicklow